Phanodermatidae is a family of nematodes belonging to the order Enoplida.

Genera

Genera:
 Crenopharynx Bastian, 1865
 Crenopharynx Filipjev, 1934
 Dayellus Inglis, 1964

References

Nematodes